Kružlová is a village and municipality in Svidník District in the Prešov Region of north-eastern Slovakia.

History
In historical records the village was first mentioned in 1414.

Geography
The municipality lies at an altitude of 285 metres and covers an area of 8.282 km². It has a population of about 565 people.

References

External links
 
 
 https://web.archive.org/web/20070513023228/http://www.statistics.sk/mosmis/eng/run.html

Villages and municipalities in Svidník District
Šariš